Maroto is a surname. Notable people with the surname include:

Esteban Maroto (born 1942), Spanish comic book artist
Mariano González Maroto (born 1984), Spanish footballer
Rafael Maroto (1783–1853), Spanish general
Raúl Maroto (born 1965), Spanish fencer
Fray Diego Maroto (1618–1696), Peruvian architect